Valeria Solovieva and Maryna Zanevska were the defending champions but did not enter the junior competition this year.

Tímea Babos and Sloane Stephens won the title, because their opponents An-Sophie Mestach and Silvia Njirić withdrew before the final match. This was their third Grand Slam girls' doubles title in the year after winning at the French Open and at the Wimbledon Championships. Babos has reached all four junior doubles finals in one single calendar year.

Seeds

Draw

Finals

Top half

Bottom half

External links 
 Main draw

Girls' Doubles
US Open, 2010 Girls' Doubles